Ptolemaida (Katharevousa: Πτολεμαΐς, Ptolemaïs) is a town and a former municipality in Kozani regional unit, Western Macedonia, Greece. Since the 2011 local government reform it is part of the municipality Eordaia, of which it is the seat and a municipal unit. It is known for its coal (lignite) mines and its power stations.

Name
During the Ottoman period the city was called Kayılar (English: Kailar, Germanic: Kajilar), rendered into English as Kaïlar. This name was retained in Greek as Kailaria (Καϊλάρια) until 1927. Kailar refers to the Kayı tribe, the tribe of Osman I, the founder of the Ottoman Empire. The modern name Ptolemaida was introduced by decree on January 20, 1927, honoring Ptolemy I Soter, son of Lagus, comrade-in-arms of Alexander the Great and founder of the Ptolemaic dynasty, and his daughter Ptolemaïs, who are said to originate from that region. His statue stands in the central square of the city.

History
According to archaeologists, the Ptolemaida region has been occupied since 6000 BC.

Neolithic period
Archaeologists, in November 2005, discovered the remains of two farming villages dating back to the Neolithic period. A press report notes that such farming villages were trading centres and had a "developed knowledge of metalworking".

A golden necklace dating to roughly 4500 BC was discovered on February 16, 2006. Associated Press reporter Costas Kantouris describes the item as a "flat, roughly ring-shaped [which] probably had religious significance and would have been worn on a necklace by a prominent member of society."

Lately in the lake Zazari near Ptolemaida there were found 16 houses that belong in the Neolithic era due to archaeologists.
These houses were in the lake and were exposed because of the decreased water level of the lake.
That particular small settlement gives information about the society and the people in the Neolithic era.

Archaic period

In the area of Ptolemaida many archeological findings have occurred in the last 30 years due to mining operations.
Ceramic artifacts, dating to the 6th century BC have been found at two sites near Grevena and Ptolemaida.
Archaeologists found the artifacts at two prehistoric farming settlements.
Two Ancient Macedonian graves have also been found in the area of Ptolemaida, dated from the 5th century BC.

Macedonian Period
In 336 BCE the area around Ptolemaida came under the control of expanding Kingdom of Macedon under Philip II. The Land of the Chords and the whole region of Eordea was fully incorporated into Macedon under Philip II and later his successor Alexander. Two of the six generals of Alexander the Great, Ptolemy I Soter, founder of the Ptolemaic Kingdom, and Aristones are claimed to hail from Eordaia.

Hellenistic period
With the death of Alexander, his empire was divided and Macedon came under the control of Antigonus I. Macedon remained an important and powerful kingdom during both Wars of the Diadochi and later the Punic wars with Rome. There were many clashes during the long struggle between the Macedonians and the Romans who tried to enter the basin of Eordea and promote it into mainland Greece, but also because the area was a focal point as a secondary road passed through it. Macedon remained a force to be reckoned with until the Battle of Pydna (22 June 168 BC), in which the Roman general Aemilius Paulus defeated King Perseus of Macedon, ending the reign of the Antigonid dynasty over Macedonia.

Roman period
For the period of Roman times we have a lot of information from historians referring to the region of Ptolemais and Eordaia. The Roman Egnatia highway, which was detached from the main artery after leaving the Straits of the Key, led to present-day Kozani and then, through the Sarantaporos Strait, to Thessaly. In 395, Ptolemaida and all of Macedonia became part of the Eastern Roman Empire.

Byzantine period

At various times, Ptolemaida was part of the First Bulgarian Empire, Latin Empire, the Kingdom of Thessalonica, Second Bulgarian Empire, the Empire of Nicaea,  the Despotate of Epirus and Serbian Empire.

Ottoman period
During the Ottoman period, Ptolemaida was called Kayılar, and it had two parts: Aşağı Kayılar and Yukarı Kayılar. Aşağı Kayılar was Bektaşi and Yukarı Kayılar was Rufai, Hanefi.

Before 1360, large numbers of nomad shepherds, or Yörüks, from the district of Konya, in Asia Minor, had settled in Macedonia; their descendants were known as Konariotes. Further immigration from this region took place from time to time up to the middle of the 18th century. After the establishment of the feudal system in 1397, many of the Seljuk noble families came over from Asia Minor; their descendants may be recognized among the Beys or Muslim landowners around Kayılar. At the beginning of the 18th century, the Turkish population was quite considerable, but since that time until at least the early 20th century it continuously decreased. A low birth rate, the exhaustion of the male population by military service, and a large mortality from epidemics brought about a decline which has lately been hastened by emigration. The Turkish rural population around Kayılar was mainly composed of Konariot shepherds. In the late 19th and early 20th century, Ptolemaida was part of the Manastir Vilayet of the Ottoman Empire.

Modern period
Ptolemaida was occupied by the Greek forces on 15 October 1912 during the First Balkan War, and later incorporated into the Greece. In 1924, the Turkish population was exchanged with Greeks from Anatolia following the population exchange between Greece and Turkey. Since then, Ptolemaida became a majority Greek city once again. In the 1970s, Greece's largest coal-fired power plants were built in the region of Ptolemaida, these increased pollution and it is expected these will be shut down by the year 2028.

Culture

Ptolemaida's football club is called "Eordaikos". Other teams include AE Ptolemaidas. Ptolemaida has schools, lyceums, gymnasia, churches, banks, a post office, a train station (Kozani - Florina), a police station, a water tower, and squares (plateia). There is the potential of a university being established by the state in the near future. The Anthropological and Folklore Museum is based in the town.

Economy

The most important lignite deposits in Greece are located in the north of the country at Ptolemais-Amynteon and Florina (approximately 1.5 billion tonnes) which contribute around 80% of national production. Other than its highly lignite-rich reserves, Ptolemaida is a highly industrialized area. The four power plants in this area produce 70% of Greece's electrical power, using the large local deposits of lignite as fuel. The plants are owned by the Public Power Corporation (DEI), the major employer in the city. The plant was inaugurated by the Prime minister of Greece at that time, Constantine Karamanlis. The other two are in Amyntaio in Florina regional unit and in Agios Dimitrios.

Education
The School of Health Sciences of University of Western Macedonia with two departments (Occupational Therapy and Midwifery) based in the city.

Climate

The city, situated in the middle of the Eordaia plain of Western Macedonia, has a humid continental climate (Dfb). Summers can be hot with thunderstorms in unsettled spells, whereas winters are among the coldest in Greece. It was here that the absolute low temperature record of Greece was recorded ( on 27 January 1963).

Demographics
According to the Encyclopædia Britannica 1911 edition, the first settlers of the city were Turks following the conquest of Macedonia by the Ottoman Empire. The Turks remained the majority until the population exchange of 1924. Between 1924 and 1926, Greeks escaping from Anatolia settled here and became the majority.
 
The current municipal unit of Ptolemaida is constituted by the city of Ptolemaida and 11 small communities. At the 2011 census, the population of the city was 32,142 residents. The total population of the municipality Eordaia in 2011 was 45,592 residents.

Geography

The city lies in the valley of Eordaia, between the Askio mountains  to the southwest and the Vermio mountains  to the northeast. It is located north of Kozani, east of Kastoria, south of Florina, and south-west of Edessa. The municipal unit has an area of 217.901 km2, the community (the city proper) has an area of 57.508 km2. Motorway 27 (Kozani-Florina, part of E65) passes east of the city. Ptolemaida was the seat of the former province of Eordaia.

Friendship towns
Ptolemaida is twinned with:

 Enkomi, Cyprus

People
Pantelis Kapetanos, football player
Ieroklis Michailidis, actor
Stiliani Papadopoulou, hammer thrower
Iordanis Konstantinidis, Greco-Roman wrestler
Mazlum Kayalar , Turkish Politician
 Yıldız Eruçman,Yıldız Kayalar Eruçman (born 1919) was the first Turkish female parachutist.

See also
Battle of Ptolemaida
List of settlements in the Kozani regional unit

References

External links
Ptolemaida news
Weather station of the National Observatory of Athens in Ptolemaida

Populated places in Kozani (regional unit)
Former municipalities in Western Macedonia
1566 establishments in Europe